Zmievskaya Balka, Zmiyovskaya Balka is a site in Rostov-on-Don, Russia at which 27,000 Jews and Soviet civilians were massacred in 1942 to 1943 by the SS Einsatzgruppe D during the Holocaust in Russia. It is considered to be the largest single mass murder site of Jews on Russian territory during the Second World War. The name means "the ravine of the snakes".

Wartime events
During the course of Operation Barbarossa, the German invasion of the Soviet Union, Wehrmacht troops occupied Rostov-on-Don on 21 November 1941, and held the city for eight days until the Red Army retook the city. The Wehrmacht recaptured the city  on 23 July 1942, and were accompanied by Einsatzkommando 10a, commanded by Heinrich Seetzen. The Einsatzkommando and Geheime Feldpolizei initially arrested some 700 people on the grounds that they were Soviet "partisans and party functionaries" and executed about 400 by 2 August 1942. 

Although many Jews had fled from Rostov when the city was under the control of the Red Army, about 2,000 remained and the Einsatzkommando began registering them, demanding that they gather at collecting points on 11 August, 1942. Between 11 August and 13 August, the Jewish men of Rostov were marched to Zmievskaya Balka, a ravine outside the city, where they were shot by the Einsatzkommando. The women, children and elderly were gassed in trucks, and their bodies buried in the same ravine. 

After the initial massacres, the SS continued to bring thousands of Jews to be killed at Zmievskaya Balka until February 1943, by which time at least 15,000 Jews had been murdered in mass shootings.

Commemoration
On 9 May 1975, the city administration of Rostov-on-Don dedicated the Zmievskaya Ravine Memorial at the site, commemorating the mass murders committed by German forces in the ravine. 

The monument has become the site of annual memorial ceremonies.

Notable victims
Sabina Spielrein, prominent early Soviet psychoanalyst

See also
History of the Jews in Rostov-on-Don

References

External links
 Zmievskaya Balka Memorial site (Russian and English)
 Ravine Memorial in Rostov-on-Don

1942 in Russia
Cultural heritage monuments in Rostov-on-Don
Holocaust locations in Russia
Holocaust massacres and pogroms in Russia
Jews and Judaism in Rostov-on-Don
Monuments and memorials in Rostov-on-Don
Cultural heritage monuments of regional significance in Rostov Oblast